Cameron Scott Jones (born May 4, 1989) is an American professional basketball player for Karhu Basket of the Korisliiga. He played college basketball for Northern Arizona University.

High school career
Jones attended Los Alamitos High School in Los Alamitos, California. He helped Los Alamitos to a 29-5 record in 2006–07 and led his team to the CIF Southern California Regional Division I first round. He averaged a team-best 18.1 points per game and 3.6 rebounds, shooting 54 percent from the field and 81 percent from the line. He was also named to the 2007 All-CIF first team and the Sunset League Most Valuable Player.

College career
In his freshman season at Northern Arizona, Jones had a minor role and limited minutes. In 31 games (one start), he averaged 3.9 points, 1.6 rebounds and 2.1 assists per game.

In his sophomore season, he had a breakout season, going on to be named to the 2009 All-Big Sky second team and received the Joe Rolle Most Valuable Player Award at the team's end of season banquet. In 27 games (23 starts), he averaged 12.7 points, 2.6 rebounds, 2.8 assists and 1.2 steals per game.

In his junior season, he again increased his play and production going on to be named to the 2010 All-Big Sky first team and again received the Joe Rolle Most Valuable Player Award at the team's end of season banquet. He was also named to the West Coast Classic All-Tournament team. In 28 games (all starts), he averaged 19.3 points, 4.6 rebounds, 2.8 assists and 1.3 steals in 35.2 minutes per game.

In his senior season, he scored 640 points on the season, breaking the school record set by Kyle Landry in 2007–08 of 561. He became the first player in school history to score 500 or more points twice and fourth overall to reach 500 points in a season, and set single season marks for fields goals (623), field goal attempts (1,296), minutes played (1,045). He was named to his second All-Big Sky first team and to the 2011 Big Sky All-Tournament team. In 32 games (all starts), he averaged 20.1 points, 4.6 rebounds and 3.2 assists in 33.7 minutes per game.

Professional career

2011–12 season
Jones went undrafted in the 2011 NBA draft. On November 3, 2011, he was selected by the Fort Wayne Mad Ants with the 10th overall pick in the 2011 NBA Development League Draft.

On December 10, 2011, Jones signed with the Miami Heat. However, he was later waived by the Heat on December 14, and subsequently returned to the Mad Ants two days later. In 48 games for the Mad Ants in 2011–12, Jones averaged 14.0 points, 2.6 rebounds and 1.9 assists per game.

2012–13 season
On October 29, 2012, Jones was reacquired by the Fort Wayne Mad Ants. On November 2, 2012, he was traded to the Santa Cruz Warriors. In 56 games for Santa Cruz in 2012–13, he averaged 12.1 points, 2.9 rebounds, 2.4 assists and 1.2 steals per game.

2013–14 season
In July 2013, Jones joined the Golden State Warriors for the 2013 NBA Summer League. On September 23, 2013, he signed with Golden State. However, he was later waived by Golden State on October 9, 2013. In November 2013, he was reacquired by the Santa Cruz Warriors. In 56 games for Santa Cruz in 2013–14, he averaged 20.2 points, 4.4 rebounds, 3.5 assists and 1.3 steals per game.

2014–15 season
In July 2014, Jones joined the Orlando Magic for the 2014 NBA Summer League. On September 6, 2014, he signed with Zenit Saint Petersburg of Russia for the 2014–15 season. In 33 league games for Petersburg, he averaged 8.6 points, 3.1 rebounds and 2.1 assists per game.

2015–16 season
On September 2, 2015, Jones signed a one-year deal with Ironi Nes Ziona of the Israeli League. On January 20, 2016, he parted ways with Ironi Nes Ziona. In 15 games for Ironi, he averaged 8.1 points, 2.4 rebounds, 2.3 assists and 1.1 steals per game. On February 1, 2016, he signed with Arkadikos of Greece for the rest of the 2015–16 Greek Basket League season. He appeared in 10 games for Arkadikos, averaging 15.6 points, 4.4 rebounds, 3.3 assists and 1.0 steals per game.

2016–17 season
On September 16, 2016, Jones signed with the Golden State Warriors. However, he was later waived by the Warriors on October 20 after appearing in five preseason games. On October 31, 2016, he was acquired by the Santa Cruz Warriors of the NBA Development League as an affiliate player of Golden State. On February 25, 2017, he was traded to the Canton Charge.

2017–18 season
On July 26, 2017, Jones signed with Kymis of the Greek Basket League.

2018–19 season
Jones played with Lavrio of the Greek Basket League.

He later played for Kauhajoen Karhu of Korisliiga. He averaged 16.8 points, 2.8 rebounds, 4.5 assists and 1.8 steals per game in four Champions League games. He also averaged 16.2 points, 4.3 boards, 5.6 assists and 1.4 steals per contest in 34 Finnish League games.

2019-20 season

He played another season for Karhu.

2020-21 season
He played for Cherkaski Mavpy of the Ukrainian Basketball SuperLeague.

2021-22 season
On August 16, 2021, Jones returned to Kauhajoki Karhu Basket.

Personal
Jones is the son of Timothy Jones and Patricia Lewis, and has one older sister, Taryn, and two younger brothers, Samuel and Timothy. He is married to actress, Theresa Moriarty.

References

External links
Northern Arizona bio
FIBA.com profile

1989 births
Living people
American expatriate basketball people in Finland
American expatriate basketball people in Greece
American expatriate basketball people in Israel
American expatriate basketball people in Russia
American men's basketball players
Arkadikos B.C. players
Basketball players from California
Basketball players from Washington (state)
BC Zenit Saint Petersburg players
Canton Charge players
Fort Wayne Mad Ants players
Ironi Nes Ziona B.C. players
Kauhajoen Karhu players
Kymis B.C. players
Lavrio B.C. players
Northern Arizona Lumberjacks men's basketball players
People from Los Alamitos, California
Santa Cruz Warriors players
Shooting guards
Sportspeople from Orange County, California